Dídac Pestaña Rodríguez (1958 – 26 July 2021) was a Spanish politician.

Biography
A member of the Socialists' Party of Catalonia (PSC-PSOE), Rodríguez served as its Regional Secretary for Baix Llobregat. In the 1983 Spanish local elections, he was elected to the City Council of Gavà, and was appointed Mayor on 7 January 1985 following the resignation of Antonio Rodríguez Aznar. He was re-elected in 1987, 1991, 1995, 1999, and 2003, each time earning an absolute majority. During his tenure the city council maintained a sound budget and strong resources, thanks to industrial and urban development. On 10 June 2005, he resigned and was succeeded by Joaquim Balsera i Garcia. From 2003 to 2007, he was Executive Vice-President of the Commonwealth of Municipalities of the Barcelona Metropolitan Area.

On 4 August 2010, Rodríguez replaced Carme Figueras following her resignation. In 2011, he was appointed Vice-President of the Transports Metropolitans de Barcelona, a position he held until his retirement in 2015.

Dídac Pestaña Rodríguez died in Gavà on 26 July 2021.

References

1958 births
2021 deaths
People from Gavà
Spanish socialists
Members of the Parliament of Catalonia
Mayors of places in Catalonia
Socialists' Party of Catalonia politicians